The women's pentathlon event at the 1970 British Commonwealth Games was held on 24 July at the Meadowbank Stadium in Edinburgh, Scotland. It was the first time that combined events were contested at the Games.

Results

References

Detailed results (p11)

Athletics at the 1970 British Commonwealth Games
1970